Nicolas "Nick" Ford (born October 8, 1999) is an American football center who is a free agent. He played college football at Utah.

Early life and high school
Ford was raised in San Pedro, California, playing high school football at San Pedro High School. He committed to play college football at Utah on February 1, 2017.

Professional career
Ford was signed by the Jacksonville Jaguars as an undrafted free agent on April 30, 2022, shortly after the conclusion of the 2022 NFL Draft. He was waived on August 30 and signed to the practice squad the next day. He was released off the practice squad on September 12, 2022.

References

External links
Utah Utes bio

1999 births
Living people
Players of American football from California
American football centers
Utah Utes football players
Jacksonville Jaguars players